Arteaga  is one of the 38 municipalities of Coahuila, in north-eastern Mexico. The municipal seat lies at Arteaga. The municipality covers an area of 1818.6 km2.

As of 2005, the municipality had a total population of 19,622.

References

Municipalities of Coahuila